InScript is a software library providing an ECMAScript engine for ECMA-262 3ed, written in C++, and some Java classes for LiveConnect. It was used by the web browser iCab 2 and 3. ICab 4 uses the WebKit Web browser engine with the ECMAScript engine JavaScriptCore. It is proprietary software, closed-source.

See also
ECMAScript
List of ECMAScript engines

External links

JavaScript dialect engines
JavaScript engines